IFAR may refer to one of the following

Ifar Gunung in Papua
International Fanconi Anemia Registry 
International Forum for Aviation Research
International Foundation for Art Research
In-Flight Aspect Ratio in Fusion Science Research